North Shore Medical Center (Miami) is a teaching hospital and a comprehensive stroke center in Miami, Florida. The hospital has more than 400 medical staff and over 700 employees. The hospital serves over 80,000 patients annually.

North Shore Medical Center is Florida's first Joint Commission (JCAHO)-accredited chest pain center as well as the first thrombectomy-capable stroke center in Miami Dade. The hospital is also fully accredited by the JCAHO, the nation's oldest and largest hospital accreditation agency.

Facilities 
North Shore Medical Center has 357 beds dedicated to emergency care, stroke care, cardiovascular care, orthopedics, bariatric surgery, diagnostic imaging, elderly care, general surgery, neurology, blood conservation, obstetrics, pain management, physical therapy, psychology, sleep study and wound care services. It has a cardiac cath lab, a comprehensive breast institute and a cancer center equipped with EDGE radiosurgery technology.

As a comprehensive stroke center, the hospital also treats patients with severe acute ischemic strokes using an advanced surgical approach.

Owned by Dallas-based Tenet Healthcare, it began to operate in 1953. In December 2020, Tenet sold North Shore Medical Center to Steward Health Care.

Recognition 
North Shore Medical Center received America's 100 Best Hospitals for Prostate Surgery Award in 2020 from Healthgrades. It was also recognized as a high-performing hospital in the U.S. News & World Report 2019–2020 ratings for Chronic Obstructive Pulmonary Disease and Heart Failure Care.

Other honors of North Shore Medical Center include:

 Patient Safety Excellence Award (2018-2019) by Healthgrades
 American Heart/American Stroke Association's Heart Association "Get With the Guidelines ® - Heart Failure Quality Achievement Award in 2018 and 2019
 Get with the Guidelines® Target: Stroke Honor Roll-Elite Plus Gold Plus Quality Achievement Award in 2019
 Labor and Delivery Excellence Awards (2017-2018) by Healthgrades
 Leapfrog Hospital Safety Grade A for Fall 2017 and Spring 2018
 Obstetrics and Gynecology Excellence Award (2017) by Healthgrades
 Outstanding Improvement in Patient Satisfaction, Tenet Hospital Strategy Conference Awards 2017

References

External links
 

Hospitals established in 1953
Hospitals in Florida